Copeina guttata is one of two fish species in the genus Copeina, which is in the family Lebiasinidae.

Description
Max length : 7.6 cm SL male/unsexed.

Distribution
South America:  middle Amazon River basin.

References

Lebiasinidae
Taxa named by Franz Steindachner
Fish described in 1876